Christ and St. Thomas (1467–1483) is a bronze statue by Andrea del Verrocchio made for one of the 14 niches on the exterior walls of the Orsanmichele in Florence, Italy, where it is now replaced by a cast and the original moved inside the building, which is now a museum. It shows the Incredulity of Thomas, frequently represented in Christian art since at least the 5th century and used to make a variety of theological points. Thomas the Apostle doubted the resurrection of Jesus and had to feel the wounds for himself in order to be convinced (John 20:24–29). The surrounding marble niche was designed by Donatello for his St Louis of Toulouse (1413), but the statue was moved to Santa Croce when the niche was sold to the Tribunale di Mercanzia (merchant's guild), who commissioned the Verrochio work.

Style 

The work was the first narrative based work to appear at Orsanmichele.  In its execution Verrocchio showed sophisticated knowledge of the style and substance of classical sculpture.  The figures were cast without backs (i.e., not in the round) as they were only to be viewed from the front.  This had the added benefits of saving on bronze (which was roughly ten times more expensive than marble), making the work lighter and easier to fit into the niche.

The interaction between the characters of Christ and St Thomas show a strong sense of movement and dialogue.  Differences between the mortal and the immortal are highlighted with Christ's passive, almost regal stance and the agitated and nervous disposition of the doubting St Thomas. The realism created by the artist is indicative of the period of art in which it was made, the Renaissance.

Mercanzia 
Part of the remit of the Merchant's guild was to be a judicial, overseeing body.  As such the theme of Christ and St Thomas would have been attractive to them as it concerned proof and the presentation of reliable evidence.

See also
 List of statues of Jesus

References 

 Hartt, Frederick and Wilkins, David G. History of Italian Renaissance Art. Upper Saddle River, NJ: Pearson Prentice Hall, 2006.

1483 sculptures
Bronze sculptures in Florence
Outdoor sculptures in Florence
Sculptures by Andrea del Verrocchio
Sculptures of Orsanmichele
Statues in Italy
Statues of apostles
Statues of Jesus
Thomas the Apostle